Tephritis azari is a species of tephritic or fruit flies in the genus Tephritis of the family Tephritidae.

Distribution
Azerbaijan, Iran.

References

Tephritinae
Insects described in 2012
Diptera of Asia